Ennejma Ezzahra ("Star of Venus"), sometimes spelled Nejma Ezzohara, also The Palace of the Baron d'Erlanger is a historical palace at Sidi Bou Said, in northern Tunisia, built from 1912 - 1922 by Baron Rodolphe d'Erlanger (1872–1932) as his home in Tunisia. It is considered to be an outstanding example of Arab-Islamic architecture in Tunisia and was built historic elements by craftsmen from Tunisia. After the independence of Tunisia in 19, it was the first museum to be opened in the country.

History and present use as a centre for musical history 
Furthermore, it acts as a regular concert venue, and has a collection of historical musical instruments, books, recordings and other objects relating to the music of Tunisia. Many recordings of the centre's historical phonographic archives can be accessed and listened to on their phonoteque website.

During World War II, the building was occupied and looted by the German military, and further damage was done, when allied troops were billeted there later in the war.

Some years after the death of his son Leo Alfred Frédéric d'Erlanger (1898–1978), Leo's widow, Baroness Edwina d'Erlanger (née Prue; died 1994), sold it to the Tunisian government, and it is now preserved as a museum, with many of its original furnishings, including paintings by the Baron, and a treasure-chest reputedly once owned by Suleiman the Magnificent.

Filming location 

The palace has also been used for filming, including the making of the movie Justine, based on Lawrence Durrell's novel of that name.

See also 

 Music of Tunisia
 Music in Tunisian Arabic

References

External links 

 Official website of the centre (in English)
 

Museums in Tunisia
Houses completed in 1922
Music museums
Music organisations based in Tunisia
Tunisian culture